Poor Man may refer to:

Music
"Poor Man", song by Odetta from the 1962 album Sometimes I Feel Like Cryin'
"Poor Man", song sung by Eric Burdon on the 1985 album That's Live, written by Woodie Guthrie 
"Poor Man", song by Depeche Mode from the 2017 album Spirit

See also
PoorMan  light-weight web server bundled with the BeOS and Haiku operating system.
Poorman (disambiguation)